Ozo Golf Club is a golf club and course on the west bank of the Ķīšezers lake in Riga, Latvia. It is the national training centre for Latvian golf teams – and host to both the national tournament and the Baltic tournament. The club opened in 2002 and is owned by the retired Latvian ice hockey player Sandis Ozoliņš.

References

External links 
 

Buildings and structures completed in 2002
Buildings and structures in Riga
Golf clubs and courses in Latvia
2002 establishments in Latvia